Phormio or Phormion may refer to:
(in date order)
 Phormio, an Athenian general during the Peloponnesian War, victorious in 428 BC
 Phormion, a student of Plato who was sent to ancient Elis
 For Phormion, a legal speech by Demosthenes delivered 350–49 BC on behalf of a freed slave of that name involved in a banking dispute
 Against Phormio, a private oration by Demosthenes delivered in c335 BC in a claim brought by Chrysippus against a different Phormio about liability for goods lost at sea.
 Phormio (play), a comedy by the Roman writer Terentius (Terence), first performed 161 BC